Chahar Mil (also Romanized as Chahār Mīl; also known as Chahār Mīl-e Ardestān, Chehāmīn, and Chehān) is a village in Rigestan Rural District, Zavareh District, Ardestan County, Isfahan Province, Iran. At the 2006 census, its population was 124, in 30 families.

References 

Populated places in Ardestan County